Buffalo Central Terminal is an historic former railroad station in Buffalo, New York. An active station from 1929 to 1979, the 17-story Art Deco style station was designed by architects Fellheimer & Wagner for the New York Central Railroad. The Central Terminal is located in the city of Buffalo's Broadway/Fillmore district. After years of abandonment, it is now owned by the non-profit preservation group Central Terminal Restoration Corporation, whichmade tremendous strides in stabilizing the facility and bringing attention to the importance of this living landmark. With over $68 million secured from public and private sources, the CTRC is nearing completion of $5.7 million in building stabilization, completed a public process to establish a master plan, expanded its organizational capacity and is undertaking a solicitation for private development partner(s), all ensuring that the Central Terminal is well positioned for rehabilitation and reuse.

Layout

Buildings
The Main Terminal Building is owned by the Central Terminal Restoration Corporation. The Main Terminal Building includes the Passenger Concourse, and the Office Tower. The Passenger Concourse included various rental spaces; a restaurant with a dining room, lunch room, and coffee shop; a Western Union telegraph office; and a soda fountain, along with standard station necessities. Off the Passenger Concourse there is a streetcar lobby and waiting room. Curtiss Street runs directly below the Passenger Concourse, but has been closed since the late 1980s for safety reasons. The Office Tower is 15 stories, excluding the main floor and mezzanin and is -high.

The Mail & Baggage Building on Curtiss Street is owned by the Central Terminal Restoration Corporation. It is a five-story building immediately adjacent to the Main Concourse. The mail building along Curtiss Street is owned by the City of Buffalo. It is a two-story building adjacent to the Baggage Building.

The Railway Express Agency was the early forerunner of today's Federal Express and UPS. The building is located behind the Mail Building of the complex and is by far the most decayed building. Trains would pull directly into the building to proceed with the load/unloading of goods. This building is currently owned by the City of Buffalo, which has confirmed plans to demolish it.

Each platform is accessed by a staircase and a ramp. The train concourse is owned by Amtrak, with the land being owned by CSX. In 1982, the bridge which connected the train concourse and passenger platforms from the terminal and main concourse was demolished to allow passage of high freight cars on the Belt Line. The rest of the concourse remains.

Former buildings

Other buildings included a Pullman Company service building, an ice house and a coach shop, all of which were torn down in 1966 to lower property taxes.

The first building built as part of the project was a cogeneration power station that provided heat and electricity to the complex, even during construction. It contained three  coal boilers. The building's smokestack was dismantled in 1966 to save on taxes. The power plant itself lasted up until the mid-1980s, with its exact demise not known.

History

Planning and construction (1925–1929)
During the late 19th century, Buffalo had several railroad stations, and there were calls for a single union station. The first attempt to direct rail traffic out of downtown Buffalo came in 1874, when a Union Depot (East Buffalo) opened there. The new station proved unpopular, and thus Exchange Street station remained open. In 1889, a new Union Station was proposed to be built on the site of the future Central Terminal, but it never happened. From about 1905, East Buffalo also served the West Shore Railroad, its service was consolidated from a station on Wick Street. East Buffalo station closed between 1921 and 1923.

The New York Central Railroad (NYC) had two stations in Buffalo in the early 20th century: the Exchange Street Station and the Terrace Station. Both of these downtown stations were old—Exchange Street dated to before the American Civil War—and were plagued with downtown congestion.

NYC decided to build the new Buffalo Central Terminal  to the east, in order to relieve both rail and grade crossing congestion and to be more conveniently located for trains not terminating in Buffalo. A roomier area would also ease the transfer of sleeping cars between trains. Furthermore, Buffalo was a quickly-growing city at the time, and it was believed that before long Central Terminal's area would become closer to the center of a sprawling metropolis of 1.5 million people. The city was not so sure, but planning was well underway in 1924, despite the lack of an agreement at the time.

NYC finalized its decision to build the terminal in 1925, and site preparation began the following year. NYC President Patrick Crowley hired Alfred T. Fellheimer and Steward Wagner to build the actual station in 1927. The total cost of the project was $14 million. Prior to the building of the station, the site was bounded to the south by the New York Central main line, to the northwest by the NYC's West Shore Railroad, and to the east by the NYC's Junction Railroad. When the station was built, the West Shore was abandoned between the NYC main line and the Junction Railroad, being rerouted via the other two lines and the new station. The former West Shore right-of-way is now Memorial Drive.

A grand celebration attended by 2,200 invited guests on June 22, 1929, opened the station. Speakers included Henry Thornton and Frank X. Schwab. Although an eastbound Empire State Express departed the station at 2:10 PM, the train was not a regular one, and was really just ceremonial. The station did not open until the celebration ended at 3:30, and scheduled service began on June 23.

Opening
In the early days, the station was served not only by the owner, but also by the Canadian National Railway, Pennsylvania Railroad, and the Toronto, Hamilton & Buffalo Railway.

For most of Central Terminal's history, far too few trains stopped there to justify the use of such a large facility. Although it started with 200 trains daily, the Great Depression began less than a year after its construction, and the rise in automobile use also hurt passenger levels.

Wartime and decline (1941–1979)

There was a burst of activity during World War II when the station had a reasonable amount of train traffic for its size. Notable trains making daily calls at the station include the Wolverine, Interstate Express, the Ohio State Limited, the Lake Shore Limited, the 20th Century Limited (engine crew-change stop only), the New England States, the Boston Express, the Empire State Express and Southwestern Limited, among many others.

After the war, the station entered into what would be a permanent decline, amid the larger decline in train travel across the country. As early as 1956, the New York Central offered the terminal for sale for one million dollars. A company called Buffprop Enterprises did negotiate a 25-year lease of the terminal in 1959, but that ended the following year. The service to Niagara Falls, New York ended by 1961.

In 1966, the continuing decrease in passenger revenues caused NYC to demolish parts of the Terminal complex, including the Pullman service building, coach shop and ice house. In 1968, the NYC merged with the PRR to form Penn Central Transportation (PC), which operated the terminal until the creation of Amtrak in 1971.

The bankrupt PC was absorbed by Conrail in April 1976. In 1978, Amtrak restored direct service to Niagara Falls. One train per day connected with Via Rail Canada/Toronto, Hamilton and Buffalo Railway service to Toronto–forerunner of today's Maple Leaf. The financially-strapped passenger carrier was in no position to rehabilitate Central Terminal, resulting in the reopening of Buffalo–Exchange Street station near downtown for the Empire Service route, including the connecting service to Toronto, further marginalizing use of Central Terminal. That left Central Terminal with only two routes — the Chicago-bound Lake Shore Limited and the Detroit-bound Niagara Rainbow. The four daily trains did not even begin to justify such a large station; Amtrak had to spend $150,000 per year on heating bills alone. The last train to call at Central Terminal was the westbound Lake Shore Limited, which departed at 4:10 am on October 28, 1979.

Ownership by Anthony Fedele (1979–1986)
The building was sold to Anthony T. Fedele, a local builder, for $75,000 in 1979. Fedele planned a 150-room hotel, offices and restaurants for the terminal complex that would have been called Central Terminal Plaza but could not find investors for the project. Fedele also lived in the building creating an apartment for himself in the tower on the second floor. While the building was under the control of Fedele it was reasonably taken care of.

It was during this time that the railroad tenant left. Conrail closed its Terminal general offices in 1980. The Conrail Dispatching Department was the last business to leave the Terminal in 1984. Two interlocking towers, numbered 48 and 49, that serviced the tracks on the property were shut down in 1985.

In November 1983, in a sign of things to come, the building was in danger of being sold out from under Anthony Fedele by the IRS for back taxes. Fedele made an attempt at settling the debt by paying $10,200 toward the $142,128 due, and agreed to pay $2000 a month until the debt was paid in full.  While he owned the building it was placed on the National Register of Historic Places on August 3, 1984.

Thomas Telesco ownership (1986–1997)

In 1986, Anthony Fedele defaulted on his taxes and US Bankruptcy Court Judge John W. Creahan ordered a foreclosure sale. The Buffalo Central Terminal was put up for auction and won by Thomas Telesco, the only bidder, for $100,000. Telesco talked about turning it into a banquet hall and using it as a station on a proposed high-speed rail line linking New York and Toronto. He later began the process of selling the architectural artifacts and other items of value from the building.
 
The building was then acquired by Bernie Tuchman and his uncle, Samuel Tuchman. This period was one of great decay for the Terminal. The Terminal's main buildings were subject to extensive artifact removal. Once a truck was being used to remove ceiling lights when it backed into the famous plaster bison statue in the concourse, smashing it. Artifacts removed and sold included iron railings, signs, lights and mailboxes. Further, the building was not secured, and vandalism was extensive, and even included some arson attempts. It is said that the only thing that saved the building was the fact that demolition would have been too expensive ($12 million).

Reacting to complaints and questions from preservationists in Buffalo, the owners responded, "If you think you could do a better job, I'll sell it to you for a dollar."

Central Terminal Restoration Corp. (1997–present)
Scott Field of the Preservation Coalition of Erie County bought the building in August, 1997 for the purchase price of $1 and assumption of approximately $70,000 in back taxes. Shortly afterward, the Central Terminal Restoration Corporation (CTRC) was formed and currently owns the Main Terminal Building and the Mail & Baggage Building.

The Central Terminal Restoration Corporation (CTRC) is a 501c3c non-profit organization driven by a mission to develop the Buffalo Central Terminal – a majestic historic landmark – as a lasting cultural and economic hub for the community. Founded in 1997 by dedicated preservationists, the CTRC has cared for this living landmark for 20 years with the steadfast and generous support of scores of volunteers.

For many years the Buffalo Central Terminal hosted to several major fundraising events each year to generate interest in reuse of the building, including tours, art shows, local political events, train shows, annual Dyngus Day and Oktoberfest, and even weddings. Since 2020 the Buffalo Central Terminal has shifted to host events outdoors on the Great Lawn, including a public art extravaganza entitled PLAY/ground, Eid al-Fitr—an outdoor prayer event celebrating the end of Ramadan, a filming by a local theater digital production, a pop up COVID-19 vaccination clinic, the Beau Fleuve Music & Arts Celebration, and annual Trunk or Treat, Seat at the Table, among others.

In 2019, the State of New York launched the East Side Avenues initiative to spur economic development on Buffalo’s East Side after decades of urban renewal policies that led to severe segregation, concentrated poverty, and disinvestment and decline. This influx of support enabled the organization to hire staff and develop the 2021 Master Plan, a shared vision developed with our neighbors for the future of the building.

Then in summer of 2022, the Buffalo Central Terminal received $61M from public and philanthropic sources to kick start reuse of the building. With this funding we will takes steps to stabilize the building and activate our Civic Commons, indoor and outdoor spaces for year-round, community events and activities. At the same time, we have begun the process to select private development partner(s) to match this significant public investment with private investment and economic development for the larger historic campus.

A Timeline:

In the 1990s, the CTRC received money to restore and relight the exterior tower clocks located on the tenth floor, relighting them on October 1, 1999. Also in 1999, a state grant for $1 million was obtained to begin the process of sealing and protecting the complex. The top of the building was re-lit starting on May 11, 2001.

In 2003, the building was re-opened for public tours. The clock in the center of the concourse, sold by earlier owners, was located in Chicago in 2003. In late 2004, the clock was purchased for $25,000 through fundraising organized by WBEN and a donation from M&T Bank. The clock was on display in the Terminal during the 2005 event season. In the fall of 2005, it was relocated to the lobby of M&T Center in downtown Buffalo, where it remained until spring of 2009. The clock was then moved back to its original location in the Terminal concourse where it will sit permanently on public display.

In 2004 the Terminal hosted a temporary art installation by controversial artist Spencer Tunick.

In 2016, Toronto-based developer Harry Stinson was named by the CTRC as the designated developer for Buffalo's Central Terminal to re-develop the Terminal complex. Stinson's proposal included turning the Terminal into a mixed use facility and also included building townhouses in the surrounding neighborhood to create a village like atmosphere with proceeds being invested into terminal restoration. The proposal also offered the possibility of restoring rail service to the terminal.

On May 5, 2017, after numerous delays, the CTRC cut ties with Stinson in favor of working with the Urban Land Institute on a new redevelopment plan.

In October, 2017 the World Monuments Fund selected Central Terminal as part of its 2018 World Monument Watch List: one of two selections from the United States and one of 25 selections total.

In 2018, two hundred solar panels were installed at the terminal, restoring commercial-grade electricity to the facility.

In 2019 the CTRC becomes a part of the East Side Avenues, an initiative born out of the Buffalo Billion catalytic investment.

In 2020 construction on the First Phase of the Passenger Concourse starts, replacement of the former restaurant roof to make the space clean and dry.

In 2021 the Master Plan is completed after an extensive community engagement effort. Replacement of the former restaurant roof is completed and the Central Terminal, Broadway Market, and Broadway- Fillmore neighborhood are awarded a $10 million Downtown Revitalization Initiative (DRI) grant.

In 2022 A Request for Expression of Interest (RFEI) is released to solicit Development Partner(s) for the reuse of the Buffalo Central Terminal. The CTRC is awarded $61 million through the Regional Revitalization Partnership, a major public and philanthropic initiative to spur economic growth on Buffalo’s East Side and across Western New York. The Central Terminal is award $1.5 million through the Broadway-Fillmore Downtown Revitalization Initiative to support enhancements to the Great Lawn. The Central Terminal receives a Community Placemaking Grant from the Project for Public Spaces to transform the Terminal’s Great Lawn from an under-designed, grassy lawn into a highly activated green space for the sharing of civic experiences.

Future

2021 Master Plan
The CTRC completed the Buffalo Central Terminal Master Plan in the summer of 2021. The Master Plan was a year-long, collaborative planning process that shaped a shared vision to transform Buffalo Central Terminal a vibrant, year-round regional venue. The Master Planning community engagement was robust despite taking place during the COVID-19, and included three public meetings with more than 325 participants, 200 online planning activities and 3,000 website visits, 60 focus group leaders in six sessions, and 25 Community Advisory Council members participating in six meetings. The Master Plan prescribes a phased plan for redevelopment of the Terminal and identifies key activation opportunities to leverage unique spaces that support local and regional enterprises, tourism and cultural exchange. Early activation of the Civic Commons – a year-round event venue forthe sharing of civic experiences by all – brings people back to the main concourse and the grounds. Later phases focus on the expansion of programs and activation of other parts of the building. The Master Plan does not completely rely on the return of rail service to the historic station, however it does accommodate future rail service should it be returned.

On June 1, 2022 Governor Kathy Hochul announced that the Buffalo Central Terminal will receive $61 million to kick start the reuse and implement the 2021 Master Plan. A staggering $300 million in funding was provided through the Regional Revitalization Partnership, an innovative, partnership between Empire State Development (ESD), the philanthropic sector, and local government that will build community wealth and catalyze economic development in Buffalo, Niagara Falls, and Rochester.

Other Reuse Plans 
The CTRC has leveraged other reuse plans to generate interest in development at the Buffalo Central Temrinal in the past. In 2009 the CTRC developed a vision plan for the future of the Terminal. In May, 2017 the CTRC, City of Buffalo and New York State decided to have the Urban Land Institute study the terminal, neighborhood and uses for the Terminal and report its findings in hope of developing a plan. The Urban Land Institute is the body responsible for the successful reuse of Buffalo's Richardson Olmsted Complex. The group's comprehensive study of the Terminal complex was fast-tracked, with a projected completion by June 30, 2017. The process included a panel of experts who would be in Buffalo for a week to conduct interviews and make a concluding presentation. The panel concluded that a strategy needs to be developed, with one of the first steps including creating a development plan for the East Side. ULI also suggested having a master plan for the building which includes breaking-down the minimum cost of repairing and stabilizing each part of the former train station. Suggestions for use included having the concourse reopen to the public with a restored restaurant as a year-round venue, as well as beautifying the green space and creating a park. Looking longer-term, 6 to 20 years, their suggestions included enhancing Fillmore Avenue and reusing vacant lots around the area. No suggestions were made for the tower or baggage buildings.

On April 13, 2018, Governor Andrew Cuomo announced $5 million in funding for a restoration of the concourse, along with the creation of a year-round event space in the concourse and waiting-room areas, and parking accessibility, along with full capacity for catering and entertainment, following the Urban Land Institute recommendations. The CTRC is also expected to transition to a professional staff.

Future of Amtrak in Buffalo
In September, 2016 the roof of the downtown Exchange Street Amtrak station collapsed. This led to calls for a new train station in Buffalo and a discussion of moving the stop back to Central Terminal. Congressman Brian Higgins called for a study for a new train station to be done at both Central Terminal and a site at Canalside saying about the terminal "It may not have been possible 15 years ago, but restoration of Central Terminal is possible in the new Buffalo."  "In the enormous scale of that redevelopment project, it may be possible to carve out a small 'station-within-a-station' that would squarely and singularly focus on providing a highly-functional train station to meet current and projected needs. This (the Central Terminal) location would allow the restoration of service to Chicago within the city limits, and it certainly merits a meaningful engineering review." Higgins' call was later reinforced by Senator Charles Schumer.

On October 5, 2016, Congressman Higgins along with Buffalo Common Council Member David Franczyk toured the terminal with Mark A. Lewandowski, president of the CTRC. Higgins came out in support of the station at the terminal as part of a larger redevelopment plan. A public campaign to bring Amtrak back to the Central Terminal was launched, complete with a website and social media.

A plan to return Amtrak to Central Terminal could possibly later add a long discussed NFTA Metro Rail extension from Downtown to the Buffalo Niagara International Airport which would include stops at Central Terminal as well as the Walden Galleria. This would connect Central Terminal to the airport as well as to the heart of downtown. On April 17, 2017 a 17-member panel including Buffalo mayor Byron Brown approved, by a margin of 10-4, a downtown replacement close to the existing Exchange Street station over the Terminal, in a decision seen as controversial. The station site and Central Terminal became part of a political debate, with candidates running in the upcoming mayoral election against Brown promising a reversal of this decision if elected.

Timeline

1925: An increasing need for a new train terminal is being seen in Buffalo. The current terminals were very hard to navigate through and were becoming too old to use. Buffalo was also becoming known as a train city, with hundreds of trains going in and out each day.
1925: The documents of the Buffalo Central Terminal are signed, allowing the Terminal to be located where it is today.
1926: Construction begins, track is laid and Lindbergh (now Memorial) Drive was created.
1927: Construction begins on the 17-story office tower.
1928: Steel work is done the entire year; the last rivet was laid in December.
June 22, 1929: Grand opening of Terminal, which brought out 2,200 people for the gala. The first train departed at 2:00 p.m. that day.
1940s: After a decline in use of trains, the number of people traveling on trains increases due to World War II.
1956: Owing to a decrease in train usage, the BCT is put up for sale for $1 million, which is about 1/14 of its original cost, and does not sell.
1961: The ICC allows the New York Central Railroad to discontinue service between Buffalo and Niagara Falls.
1966: The Pullman Service Building, Coach Shop, Ice House and Power House are demolished to reduce costs.
1968: The New York Central Railroad and the Pennsylvania Railroad merge to form Penn Central: the new owners of the Terminal.
1970: Penn Central goes bankrupt.
1971: Amtrak created, and uses the Terminal as its central Buffalo station.
1976: Penn Central RR, Lehigh Valley RR, Erie Lackawanna RR, Central Railroad of New Jersey and Lehigh & Hudson River RR merge into Conrail, the new owner of the Terminal.
October 28, 1979: Amtrak abandons the Terminal on October 28, for the newer Dick Road station in Depew.
1982: Train concourse bridge is demolished so taller freight cars can pass through the station on the "Belt Line".
1984: The Terminal is placed on the State and National Registers of Historic Places; therefore, it is now unable to be easily torn-down.
1985: Tony Fedele requests energy surveys from the NY State Energy Office for the remaining five buildings that were part of the Terminal.
1986: Fedele goes bankrupt and the Bankruptcy Court awards it to Thomas Telesco for $100,000, being the only bidder.
1986-1997: The Terminal faces a period of mostly-neglect. The two owners during the period, Telesco and Tuchman, sell-off most of the valuable items, and vandals who can easily access the building destroy it. Weather also damages it, causing severe water damage to much of the concourse. A few arsons also occur.
1990: Complex sold to Bernie Tuchman.
1993: The concourse, owned by Amtrak, is leased for heavy equipment storage.
1997: The Buffalo Central Terminal Restoration Corporation buys the Terminal for $1, and about $70,000 in back taxes.
1999: $1 million of Erie County money is set aside to fix the tower. The clock was re-lit again on October 1 of that year.
2000: A large snowstorm causes the city to dump loads of snow on the unstable property, and the Central Terminal Restoration Corporation (CTRC) sues the city for $1 million. The city decides to cancel the $70,000 the CTRC owes it for back taxes.
2003: The removal of 350 tons of debris, repairs, asbestos removal, roof work and the repair of 4000 windows. The Terminal is able to be opened for tours.
November 2003: The BCT is put on the Preservation League of New York State's "Seven to Save" list.
2004: BCT turns 75 and has a big celebration. The city gives it $75,000 for rehabilitation of the building.
May 2005: The original concourse clock, found for sale on eBay out of Chicago, was (with the help of M&T Bank, WBEN and many Buffalonians) saved, and the CTRC was able to purchase it.
2006: The Buffalo Central Terminal has 20,000 visitors, breaking a record, due to Oktoberfest, the Buffalo Brewfest and the Train Show.
2007: CTRC celebrates tenth anniversary as the Dyngus Day celebration comes back to the Terminal.
2008: Two large projects are completed: abatement in the restaurant area and concrete work by the entrance.
2009: Buffalo Central Terminal celebrates its 80th Anniversary in June, and the Main Concourse Clock returns to the Terminal.
2011: Master plan outlining reuse of the complex released to the public. CTRC awarded a $306,000 grant from New York State Office of Parks, Recreation, and Historic Preservation to repair and restore two of the original entryway canopies. A replica Buffalo statue is placed in the Main Concourse. Urban Habitat Project launched to transform a portion of the grounds. First public tours up to the third floor of the tower are held.
2012: With help from public donations, the CTRC acquires one of the Terminal's original light fixtures for $3,000 from a Toronto antique dealer. After raising the $3,000, the dealer agrees to donate the fixture to the CTRC.
2013: CTRC begins phase 1 of the replacement of the roof over the passenger waiting room. Replacement concourse light fixtures are made from the donated original light fixture by Sheet Metal Workers Union 71.
2016: Parts of the main concourse, including the ticket areas, two union news stands and the main entrance, are cosmetically restored, by and as part of filming for the movie Marshall.
2017: $250,000 in electrical upgrades are secured.
2018: $5 million from the State of New York Empire State Development (ESD) is secured for restoration of the concourse, full capacity for catering and entertainment and professional CTRC staff.
2018: 200 solar panels restore commercial-grade electricity.
2019: The CTRC becomes a part of the East Side Avenues, an initiative born out of the Buffalo Billion catalytic investment.
2020: Construction on the First Phase of the Passenger Concourse starts, replacement of the former restaurant roof to make the space clean and dry.
2021: the Master Plan is completed after an extensive community engagement effort. Replacement of the former restaurant roof is completed and the Central Terminal, Broadway Market, and Broadway- Fillmore neighborhood are awarded a $10 million Downtown Revitalization Initiative (DRI) grant.
2022: A Request for Expression of Interest (RFEI) is released to solicit Development Partner(s) for the reuse of the Buffalo Central Terminal. The CTRC is awarded $61 million through the Regional Revitalization Partnership, a major public and philanthropic initiative to spur economic growth on Buffalo’s East Side and across Western New York. The Central Terminal is award $1.5 million through the Broadway-Fillmore Downtown Revitalization Initiative to support enhancements to the Great Lawn. The Central Terminal receives a Community Placemaking Grant from the Project for Public Spaces to transform the Terminal’s Great Lawn from an under-designed, grassy lawn into a highly activated green space for the sharing of civic experiences.

Statuary

Several notable statues have graced the station's space over the years. The station once had a stuffed American bison in the concourse, belonging to the Buffalo Museum of Science and used to advertise the museum. Passengers (including soldiers bound for World War II) rubbing their hands on the bison caused it to become worn, so it was removed to the Buffalo Museum of Science and replaced with a plaster cast, bronze painted statue. This statue was accidentally destroyed by an owner during abandonment. A bronze recasting from the original molds can be found outside Alumni Arena at the University at Buffalo North Campus. On October 17, 2011 the buffalo in the terminal was replaced by the Central Terminal Restoration Corporation with one made out of fiberglass donated by Mollenberg-Betz, Inc., a Western New York-based mechanical contractor and Niagara Coatings Services, which specializes in various industrial coatings.

After the station was closed, the statue called "Progress" was placed on the terminal plaza by Anthony Fedele, who was the owner of the building after it closed. The statue was intended to signify the rebirth of the Central Terminal. Some people within the CTRC had thought to move the statue to the Griffis Sculpture Park in East Otto, New York but that was an impossibility due to its horrible condition. Since it was in incredible disrepair—tilting, falling apart, of no historical significance and an eyesore—Bob Rushok, a leader of the building's restoration, had a City of Buffalo payloader demolish it during a community cleanup event in the early 2000's and haul it away.

In popular culture
In November, 2005, Red Scream Films LLC shot its first feature film, Prison of the Psychotic Damned, in the Terminal. The low-budget film details what happens when a group of dysfunctional ghost-hunters decide to spend a night in the long rumored to be haunted structure. A benefit sneak-peek screening of the film, with all proceeds going to the CTRC, was held on June 23, 2006, at 6 pm. The film company returned to the Terminal in August to shoot part of its third feature FrightWorld.

The paranormal investigators, The Atlantic Paranormal Society (TAPS), visited the terminal for about a week in June, 2008 and aired their findings on Ghost Hunters (Episode 417 - "Speaking With the Dead"), September 24, 2008. Footage taken during this investigation shows that, aside from the main concourse, the entire complex is still currently in a state of heavy disrepair. The spin-off show Ghost Hunters Academy visited the terminal for the episode broadcast December 2, 2009. On October 31, 2010 (Halloween), Ghost Hunters aired a live 6-hour broadcast from the station.

Gallery

See also
List of tallest buildings in Buffalo
Tower City Center – Formerly the Cleveland Union Terminal, a similar train station-turned-entertainment center
Buffalo–Exchange Street station

References

External links

Buffalo Central Terminal on Opacity.com
National Register of Historic Places official record
Magazine article from American Architect (1927) with original floor plans

Architecture of Buffalo, New York
Art Deco architecture in New York (state)
Clock towers in New York (state)
Former Amtrak stations in New York (state)
National Register of Historic Places in Buffalo, New York
Railway stations closed in 1979
Railway stations on the National Register of Historic Places in New York (state)
Railway stations in the United States opened in 1929
Skyscraper office buildings in Buffalo, New York
Former New York Central Railroad stations
Former Pennsylvania Railroad stations
Union stations in the United States
Unused buildings in New York (state)
Railway stations in Buffalo, New York
1929 establishments in New York (state)
Former railway stations in New York (state)